The 1901 South Carolina Gamecocks football team was an American football team that represented South Carolina College—now known as the University of South Carolina–aas an independent during the 1901 college football season. In its first and only season under head coach Byron W. Dickson, the team compiled a 3–4 record. R. L. Freeman was the team captain. The team played its home games at the college ballpark that later became known as Davis Field in Columbia, South Carolina.

Schedule

References

South Carolina
South Carolina Gamecocks football seasons
South Carolina Gamecocks football